A klippe (German for cliff or crag) is a geological feature of thrust fault terrains. The klippe is the remnant portion of a nappe after erosion has removed connecting portions of the nappe. This process results in an outlier of exotic, often nearly horizontally translated strata overlying autochthonous strata. Examples of klippes include:
Chief Mountain, Montana
Mount Yamnuska, Alberta
The Rock of Gibraltar

Klippes may also be found in the Pre-Alps of Switzerland and some of the isolated mountains in Assynt, Sutherland, in NW Scotland.

References 

Structural geology